Adnan Kahveci (20 February 1949 – 5 February 1993) was a noted Turkish politician who served as a key advisor to Prime Minister Turgut Özal throughout the 1980s. He was one of the founders in 1983 of the Motherland Party (ANAP) led by Turgut Özal, and later a minister in Özal's government. He died in a car accident in 1993.
Prior to his political career in Turkey, Kahveci had led a successful career as an electrical engineer and academic in the United States, having done his studies in Purdue University and having risen to become a professor at the University of Missouri.

Background
He was born in Sürmene, Trabzon Province in 1949. Adnan Kahveci was recognized very early as a child prodigy, having come first in a nationwide exam organized by the newspaper Milliyet among primary school students in 1961, in the entry exams for the select Kabataş High School in 1966, in another nationwide exam organized this time by the newspaper Hürriyet and among high school students, in the nationwide university entry exams in 1966 and in Istanbul University scholarship exams. He pursued his studies in electrical engineering in Purdue University in the United States and obtained his doctorate from University of Missouri where he went on to become a professor.

After his return to Turkey, he was, for a time in the academic staff of Boğaziçi University.

Political career
In the early 1980s Kahveci was "chef de cabinet" (chief of staff) to Prime Minister Turgut Özal, becoming, in the words of The Independent, "the main link between Ozal and the outside world, including local politicians and civil servants, the military, as well as Western journalists and foreign investors." When Özal broke with the military in 1982, Kahveci supported his creation of the ANAP (Motherland Party), and would have stood in the 1983 elections if he had not been banned by the military. He became Özal's chief advisor, and entered Parliament in the 1987 elections.

He then served for three terms, and was Minister of State responsible, notably, for the Turkish Radio and Television Corporation (TRT) as well as Minister of Finance (1990 - 1991). Under his tenure, TRT slowly and through equivocal means ceased to be the single TV network in Turkey's media, as private networks were increasingly tolerated and then legalised. As minister and previously advisor to Özal, Kahveci played a catalytic role in many of the key steps taken by ANAP in the eighties, including shaping Turkey's first privatisations. He also followed up allegations of corruption, arranging for a minister who had accepted a pay-off for contracting a shipment of oil to be taped during the conversation on the transaction, and bringing the recording to Özal. Both in office and during the short subsequent period he spent as a member of the opposition after the 1991 elections, he was widely recognized as a maverick deputy, who spoke his mind irrespective of the party line.

Prior to his death, Kahveci was working with Özal on the Kurdish question, and wrote a report urging a peaceful solution, including recognition of the Kurdish language. According to the autobiography of Sakıp Sabancı, Özal had also entrusted Kahveci with the issue of potentially reserving seats in Parliament for minorities (an idea Sabancı had urged Özal to take up).

Death
Kahveci died in a car accident in Gerede on 5 February 1993, together with his wife and daughter.

References

Books

Sources

 
 

1949 births
1993 deaths
People from Sürmene
Motherland Party (Turkey) politicians
Ministers of Finance of Turkey
Turkish electrical engineers
Purdue University College of Engineering alumni
Kabataş Erkek Lisesi alumni
University of Missouri faculty
Academic staff of Boğaziçi University
Road incident deaths in Turkey
Deputies of Istanbul
Ministers of Customs and Trade of Turkey
Members of the 46th government of Turkey
Members of the 47th government of Turkey
Members of the 48th government of Turkey
Ministers of State of Turkey